Northwest Airlines Flight 188 was a regularly scheduled flight from San Diego, California, to Minneapolis/St. Paul, Minnesota, on October 21, 2009, which landed over one hour late in Minneapolis/St Paul after overshooting its destination by more than  because of pilot error. As a result of the incident, the Federal Aviation Administration (FAA) revoked the pilot certificates of the involved pilots and the National Transportation Safety Board (NTSB) issued recommendations for changes to air traffic control procedures and the rules for cockpit crew. The incident also caused American lawmakers to move to prevent pilots on U.S. airliners from using personal electronic devices while taxiing or flying. In 2013, changes to flight deck automation were suggested, and prototype designs that could mitigate errors leading to similar incidents were described.

Incident 
The Airbus A320 took off from San Diego International Airport at 5:01 p.m. CDT (3:01 pm in San Diego).  It was scheduled to land at 8:01 p.m. CDT. Just under two hours after takeoff, at 6:56 p.m. CDT, Air Traffic Control lost radio contact with the aircraft while it was over Denver. 

Per federal regulations, the Denver ARTCC (where contact was lost) instructed the pilots to contact the Minneapolis ARTCC to obtain an amended clearance to land in Minneapolis. However, the pilots did not do so. Both the Denver and Minneapolis ARTCC made several unsuccessful attempts to reach the pilots. At the request of the Minneapolis ARTCC, Northwest's dispatchers made at least eight attempts to reach the pilots and urge them to reestablish radio contact, without success. When other pilots in the area got word of the situation, they tried to help the controllers and attempted to raise the pilots as well. Northwest also sent them a radio text message, which went unanswered. Authorities were concerned enough that NORAD readied fighter jets to check on the welfare of the plane. Officials at the White House Situation Room were alerted as well.

Just as the fighter jets were about to scramble, air traffic control at Minneapolis-St. Paul International Airport reestablished radio contact with the plane at 8:14 p.m. Captain Timothy Cheney and first officer Richard Cole said that they were not aware of their location until a flight attendant asked them what time they were due to land. The overshoot concerned air traffic controllers enough that they had the pilots perform a series of maneuvers to confirm the pilots were in control of the plane, as well as to verify that the transponder target they were receiving on their radar was indeed Flight 188. The aircraft finally landed, over an hour late, at 9:04 p.m. CDT.

Investigation 
During the investigation, Cheney and Cole told National Transportation Safety Board investigators that they were going over schedules using their laptop computers—a serious breach of piloting fundamentals, as well as a violation of Delta Air Lines policy (Delta had recently merged with Northwest). The pilots denied suggestions from some aviation safety experts that they had fallen asleep.

The pilots claimed that, despite not hearing any radio calls nor seeing any visual notifications, they had not been asleep. In the United States, the FAA prohibits pilots from taking short naps, but airlines from other countries allow short naps while outside of U.S. airspace. These airlines include British Airways, Qantas, and Air France. The cockpit voice recorder was checked by investigators, but there was only 30 minutes' worth of information. Over an hour's worth of information would have been needed for all of the information of the portion of the flight past Minneapolis to be available.

Findings 
On October 27, 2009, the FAA grounded the pilots. The FAA found that Cheney and Cole were out of radio contact with air traffic controllers for more than an hour and a half "while you were on a frolic of your own." It cited the pilots for acting in "total dereliction and disregard" for their duties, and were "disengaged and impervious" to the danger their actions posed to themselves, the passengers and the crew. Among other things, the FAA found that the pilots failed to comply with air traffic control instructions and clearances and failed to monitor the plane's radios. The FAA found that the pilots operated the plane in a careless and reckless manner, and thus showed that they lacked "the degree of care, skill, judgment and responsibility" to hold a pilot's license. The incident and subsequent investigation have led to some changes in the rules for cockpit crew and air traffic controllers.

Another issue of concern was the over an hour long delay from the time air traffic controllers realized the plane was out radio contact until an alert on the Domestic Events Network (DEN) was created and NORAD was informed of the situation. The commander of NORAD, General Gene Renuart Jr., said in an interview that ideally an alert is created within 10 minutes of losing contact and if they had been alerted in time, fighter jets would have been scrambled to intercept.  By the time fighters were ready to take off, the flight crew were back in contact with ground controllers. An updated FAA notice effective November 10, 2010 called for an alert to be made within five minutes of last recorded radio contact.

References

External links 
Northwest Airlines flight leads to probe of pilot professionalism
The inside story of Northwest 188 plus, Congress gets it right, for once: Tough new hiring rules for airlines and pilots

National Transportation Safety Board
Full NTSB docket including:
 Submission of Delta Air Lines To the National Transportation Safety Board
 Submission of the National Air Traffic Controllers Association Regarding the Incident Involving Northwest 188
 Project Information

Accidents and incidents involving the Airbus A320
Airliner accidents and incidents in Minnesota
Aviation accidents and incidents in the United States in 2009
188
Airliner accidents and incidents caused by pilot error
October 2009 events in the United States
2009 in Minnesota